The Atlas Performing Arts Center is a multiple space performing arts facility located on H Street in the Near Northeast neighborhood of Washington, DC. Housed in a renovated Art Deco movie house, the facility is home to several arts organizations.

History

The Atlas Movie Theater was built in 1938 by the Kogod-Burka movie chain, one of four movie houses on the then-bustling commercial corridor. The riots of 1968 devastated the area and many businesses and residents abandoned H Street for the suburbs. The area became neglected with many empty buildings. The Atlas closed for good in 1976. The H Street Community Development Corporation purchased the theater in 1985, and renovated the Art Moderne facade in 1989.

In 2001 The Atlas Performing Arts Center purchased the building from the H Street Community Development Corporation. In 2002, the Sprenger-Lang Foundation donated $450,000 of the $1.2 million asking price.
The building was renovated for $22 million, beginning in 2004. The structure was completely gutted and three adjacent buildings were combined under one roof to house the current Arts Center. The Atlas Performing Arts Center opened in March 2005.

The nearly  facility boasts one 260 seat proscenium theatre, one large flexible seat black box theatre and two smaller Lab Theatres. There are three dance studios, managed by Joy of Motion Dance Center. In the lower level there is a scene shop, seven dressing rooms, one green room and office space for the Atlas and its Resident Arts Partners. Douglas E. Yeuell has been the organization's Executive Director since 2014.

Atlas Arts Partners
Joy of Motion Dance Center
Congressional Chorus
American Youth Chorus
Capital City Symphony
Step Afrika!
City at Peace
Mosaic Theater Company of Washington DC

Intersections
In the winter of 2010 the Atlas hosted its first arts festival, Intersections. Under the direction of artistic director Mary Hall Surface, the goal of the festival was to bring artists from different disciplines, ages and cultural backgrounds together under one roof to celebrate and explore the areas to make new connections and break new ground.

Over 5000 people came to the Atlas of the three weekends of the festival, many of whom were new to the Atlas and to H Street. The Atlas plans to host Intersections annually.

See also
 National Register of Historic Places listings in the District of Columbia
 Theater in Washington D.C.
 Newton Theater

References

External links 

 
Washington D.C., Atlas Theatre : 1964
Atlas Theater - Washington, DC
Atlas Theatre - 1331 H Street NE, Washington, DC
 Atlas Theater < Projects < BELLArchitects
 Georgetown Law Library

Theatres on the National Register of Historic Places in Washington, D.C.
Art Deco architecture in Washington, D.C.
Performing arts centers in Washington, D.C.
Theatres completed in 1938
Theatres in Washington, D.C.
Event venues established in 1938
Event venues established in 2005
1938 establishments in Washington, D.C.
2005 establishments in Washington, D.C.
Event venues on the National Register of Historic Places in Washington, D.C.
Near Northeast (Washington, D.C.)